Javier Aguirre Onaindía (born 1 December 1958), nicknamed El Vasco (The Basque), is a Mexican former professional footballer and manager who is currently in charge of Spanish team RCD Mallorca.

Aguirre played for Mexico at the 1986 World Cup, and was twice manager of the team, taking them to the World Cup in 2002 and 2010. He also won the 2009 CONCACAF Gold Cup and led them to the final of the 2001 Copa América. Later, he managed Japan and Egypt.

At club level, Aguirre led six clubs in Spain's La Liga. He finished fourth with Osasuna in 2006 and Atlético Madrid in 2008, and also took the former to the 2005 Copa del Rey Final. He also won the CONCACAF Champions League with Monterrey in 2021.

Playing career

Club
Aguirre began his career as a youth product of Club América in 1979, though he was sold to Los Angeles Aztecs of the North American Soccer League. Club América later bought him back, where he established himself as a midfielder. He played an integral part in their various title winning seasons, most notably during the 1983–84 season where América reached the league finals against arch-rivals Guadalajara, managing to score a goal in a 3–1 win at the Estadio Azteca. Aguirre also played outside Mexico, signing with Osasuna in Spain in 1986. In 1987, he transferred to Guadalajara, where he made over 100 appearances up until his retirement in 1993.

International
Aguirre made 59 appearances for the Mexico national team between 1983 and 1992, scoring 13 goals. He played in the FIFA World Cup on home soil in 1986, and was sent off in the quarter-final defeat to West Germany; the game went to penalties after a 0–0 draw. He was the first Mexican to be sent off at a World Cup.

Managerial career

Early years
After retiring as a player, he took up managing, first with Atlante and then Club Pachuca, where he won the Invierno championship in 1999.

Mexico
On 22 June 2001, Aguirre was appointed manager of Mexico when Enrique Meza resigned; the team were fifth in their qualifying group for the 2002 FIFA World Cup after losing 3–1 away to Honduras, in a run of one win in 12 games. In his first game on 1 July, El Tri beat rivals the United States at home with a single Jared Borgetti goal. The Mexicans qualified in second place behind Costa Rica after a 3–0 win at the Estadio Azteca against the Hondurans on 11 November.

Also in July 2001, Aguirre led Mexico at the 2001 Copa América in Colombia. They defeated Brazil, Chile and Uruguay before losing the final by a single goal to the hosts. A year later at the 2002 World Cup in South Korea and Japan, his side won their group at Italy's expense before losing 2–0 to the US in the second round.

Osasuna
On 6 June 2002, while leading Mexico at the World Cup, Aguirre joined Spanish La Liga club CA Osasuna when Miguel Ángel Lotina quit for RC Celta de Vigo; he had previously played for the Navarrese club. In his first season in Pamplona, the club reached the semi-finals of the Copa del Rey, losing 4–2 on aggregate to Recreativo de Huelva.

In 2004–05, Aguirre went one better, guiding Osasuna to the cup final, where they lost 2–1 after extra time to Real Betis. In the following league season, the Rojillos beat Sevilla FC to a joint-best 4th place and their first qualification to the UEFA Champions League, having led the table after 11 games.

Atlético Madrid
On 24 May 2006, days after Osasuna finished the season in fourth, Aguirre signed a one-year contract to replace Pepe Murcia at Atlético Madrid. After a fourth-place finish in 2008 confirmed a place in the Champions League, he extended his deal by another year.

Aguirre was dismissed from the Vicente Calderón Stadium on 2 February 2009, after a run of two points from five games. He was replaced by the team's former goalkeeper Abel Resino, who arrived from CD Castellón.

Return to Mexico
On 3 April 2009, Aguirre was officially appointed as the new manager of the Mexico national team, replacing Sven-Göran Eriksson. He was officially presented as Mexico manager in a press conference on 16 April 2009. At the press conference, he stated: "I add, gentlemen, that I want the player who comes, come with pride, to recover the identity that comes with our love for the shirt" and that a call-up "is a reward and not a punishment, that we're all here because it is a prize for our careers." His annual salary was reported to be US$1,635,000.

On 6 June 2009, Aguirre debuted in a 2010 FIFA World Cup qualifier against El Salvador, losing 2–1. However, he rebounded four days later with a 2–1 win over Trinidad and Tobago.

On 9 July 2009, Aguirre was ejected in an incident during the 2009 CONCACAF Gold Cup match versus Panama. During a play along the sideline, Aguirre kicked Panamanian player Ricardo Phillips, triggering Phillips to push Aguirre, causing ejections for both Aguirre and Phillips and delaying the match for over 10 minutes due to the refusal of the player from Panama to leave the field.  Aguirre apologized to the Mexican fans, media, football players and staff, but never extended such courtesy to Philips or the Panamanian team. He was suspended for three games and the Mexican Football Federation was fined US$25,000 by CONCACAF.

On 26 July 2009, Aguirre led Mexico to its fifth Gold Cup title and its first win against the United States outside of Mexico since 1999. He then led Mexico to a comeback win over the same opposition at the Estadio Azteca on 12 August 2009 and followed it up by winning 3–0 in Costa Rica, putting Mexico closer to a qualifying spot for the World Cup that seemed to be an impossible task at the time when Eriksson was sacked. On 10 October 2009, Mexico beat El Salvador in the Estadio Azteca 4–1, qualifying Mexico for the 2010 FIFA World Cup.

After that, in their last hexagonal game against Trinidad and Tobago, they tied 2–2, ending the World Cup qualifying journey.

On 30 June 2010, Aguirre resigned as coach of Mexico following their failure to reach the quarter-finals of the 2010 FIFA World Cup in South Africa. Mexico finished second in Group A, ahead of hosts South Africa and France, but their progress was halted in the round of 16 where they were defeated 3–1 by Argentina.

Aguirre's decision-making during the qualifying stages and during the World Cup garnered criticism, with ESPN broadcaster José Ramón Fernández calling him the worst coach at the World Cup after France's Raymond Domenech. His insistence on playing team-less striker Guillermo Franco, while keeping Manchester United striker Javier Hernández on the bench bewildered many fans and commentators. Aguirre came under additional criticism for his refusal to explain his decisions.

During the run up to the World Cup Aguirre expressed his desire to coach in the Premier League in England, but did not receive any offers.

Real Zaragoza
Aguirre was named manager of Real Zaragoza on 17 November 2010, he was presented in a press conference the following day. He was sacked on 29 December 2011 for putting the team in the relegation zone, the club owner quoted that the team has never done so bad in their club history.

Espanyol

On 28 November 2012, Aguirre was named manager of RCD Espanyol, at that point 20th in the La Liga table. He kept them up in the 2013–14 season by three points. Aguirre announced he was leaving Espanyol on 16 May 2014, and was replaced 11 days later by former player Sergio.

Japan
In August 2014, Aguirre was named as new manager of the Japan national team, replacing Alberto Zaccheroni, who had resigned following the World Cup. At the 2015 AFC Asian Cup, Japan won all three of its group matches, scoring seven goals and conceding none, though was knocked out in the quarter final by the United Arab Emirates.

On 3 February 2015, the Japanese Football Association announced they had annulled the contract with Aguirre, after they confirmed that Spanish anti-corruption investigators had indicted Aguirre, who they alleged was involved in an ongoing match-fixing investigation  over Real Zaragoza's 2–1 win over Levante on the final day of the 2010–11 season, while Aguirre was manager of Zaragoza.

Al Wahda
On 18 June 2015, Aguirre was hired as new manager of the Al-Wahda FC from United Arab Emirates. On 21 May 2017, after leading Al Wahda to the President's Cup championship victory, Aguirre decided to step down as manager.

Egypt
In July 2018, Aguirre was on a four-man shortlist for the vacant Egyptian national team manager job. He was appointed manager in August 2018. During the 2019 Africa Cup of Nations, which was hosted in Egypt, the national team was eliminated by South Africa in the Round of 16. As a result, Aguirre was sacked along with the whole technical and administrative staff of the national team for the disappointing result.

Leganés
In November 2019, Aguirre returned to La Liga, taking over a CD Leganés team after the dismissal of Mauricio Pellegrino. He signed to the end of the season, with the option of another. The team were relegated on the final day of the season in July 2020, and he left.

Monterrey
In December 2020, Aguirre returned to the Mexican league for the first time since 2001, signing a two-year deal at C.F. Monterrey. On 26 February 2022, he was dismissed by after taking five points from five games, despite winning the CONCACAF Champions League weeks earlier.

Mallorca
On 24 March 2022, Aguirre returned to La Liga, joining RCD Mallorca, who were one point inside the relegation zone with nine games to go. He kept the team up on the final day at the expense of Granada CF, by winning away at his former club Osasuna.

Controversy
In January 2015, it has been reported by Spanish media that a Valencia court had accepted a claim filed by Spanish prosecutors alleging some 40 people, including Aguirre, were involved in fixing a match between his former club Real Zaragoza and Levante UD in 2011. Court proceedings were expected to start the following month. Aguirre had previously denied the accusations at a press conference held in December 2014.

Managerial statistics

Honours

Player
América
Mexican Primera División: 1983–84

Manager
Pachuca
Mexican Primera División: Invierno 1999

Osasuna
Copa del Rey runner-up: 2004–05

Al-Wahda
UAE President's Cup: 2016–17
UAE League Cup: 2015–16

Monterrey
CONCACAF Champions League: 2021

Mexico
CONCACAF Gold Cup: 2009
Copa América runner-up: 2001

References

External links

 Real Zaragoza official profile 
 
 
 
 NASL Players profile
 2010 FIFA World Cup profile
 

1958 births
Living people
Mexican people of Basque descent
Footballers from Mexico City
Association football midfielders
Club América footballers
Los Angeles Aztecs players
Atlante F.C. footballers
CA Osasuna players
C.D. Guadalajara footballers
Liga MX players
North American Soccer League (1968–1984) players
La Liga players
Mexico international footballers
1986 FIFA World Cup players
Mexican expatriate footballers
Mexican expatriate sportspeople in the United States
Mexican expatriate sportspeople in Spain
Expatriate soccer players in the United States
Expatriate footballers in Spain
Mexican football managers
Atlante F.C. managers
C.F. Pachuca managers
Mexico national football team managers
CA Osasuna managers
Atlético Madrid managers
Real Zaragoza managers
RCD Espanyol managers
Japan national football team managers
Al Wahda FC managers
Egypt national football team managers
CD Leganés managers
C.F. Monterrey managers
RCD Mallorca managers
Liga MX managers
La Liga managers
UAE Pro League managers
2001 Copa América managers
2002 FIFA World Cup managers
2010 FIFA World Cup managers
2015 AFC Asian Cup managers
2019 Africa Cup of Nations managers
CONCACAF Gold Cup-winning managers
Mexican expatriate football managers
Mexican expatriate sportspeople in Japan
Mexican expatriate sportspeople in the United Arab Emirates
Mexican expatriate sportspeople in Egypt
Expatriate football managers in Spain
Expatriate football managers in Japan
Expatriate football managers in the United Arab Emirates
Expatriate football managers in Egypt
Mexican footballers